Mahmoud Jaber (or Mahmmoud Gaber, ; born 5 October 1999) is an Israeli professional footballer who plays as a defensive midfielder for Israeli Premier League club Maccabi Haifa and the Israel national team.

Early life
Jaber was born in Tayibe, Israel, to a Muslim-Arab family. His grandfather Abdullah and his father Nabil were renowned local footballers in his hometown. His older brother Abdallah Jaber is also a professional footballer who played for as well as captained the Palestine national team.

Career
Jaber is a youth product of the academy of Hapoel Kfar Saba, before moving to Maccabi Haifa's youth academy at the age of 12. He began his senior career on loan with Hapoel Nof HaGalil from 2019 to 2021. In his second year on loan, he helped Hapoel Nof HaGalil win the 2020–21 Toto Cup Leumit and the 2021–22 Liga Leumit earning promotion into the Israel Premier League. He returned to Maccabi Haifa on 15 August 2021, signing an extension keeping him at the club until 2024. There, he helped them win the 2021–22 Israeli Premier League, 2021–22 Toto Cup Al and 2021 Israel Super Cup in his debut season.

International career
Jaber was first called up to the senior Israel national team ahead of the 2022–23 UEFA Nations League matches in June 2022. He debuted with Israel in a 2–2 UEFA Nations League home draw against Iceland on 2 June 2022.

Honours
Hapoel Nof HaGalil
Liga Leumit: 2021–22
Toto Cup Leumit: 2020–21

Maccabi Haifa
Israeli Premier League: 2021–22
Toto Cup Al: 2021–22
Israel Super Cup: 2021

References

External links
 
 

1999 births
Living people
Israeli footballers
People from Tayibe
Footballers from Central District (Israel)
Hapoel Nof HaGalil F.C. players
Maccabi Haifa F.C. players
Israeli Premier League players
Liga Leumit players
Israel international footballers
Arab-Israeli footballers
Israeli Muslims
Arab citizens of Israel
Israeli people of Palestinian descent
Association football midfielders